is a Japanese musician, songwriter and record producer. He is also famous for being a guitarist of the Japanese band Supercar.

Biography 
Ishiwatari found an ad looking for band members that had been posted by Miki Furukawa at a musical instrument store in Hachinohe.  He made contact with her in 1995, invited his childhood friend Kōji Nakamura, and while still in high school they formed a band. Kōdai Tazawa later joined the band, which was named Supercar.

Supercar made its debut with a major label in 1997 and in 1998 it released the influential debut album, Three Out Change. Music critic Ian Martin has called it "one of the all-time great Japanese rock albums." Ishiwatari played guitar and wrote all the lyrics.

During the late 1990s and early 2000s, Supercar continued to perform and produced albums that increasingly combined alternative rock with electronic music.  Supercar has been characterized as having "almost foundational importance to 21st century Japanese indie rock".  The band broke up in 2005, and Ishiwatari began working as a lyricist and record producer.

In 2010, Ishiwatari released the single "Kamisama no Iutōri" with Yoshinori Sunahara who was a former member of Denki Groove. They featured Etsuko Yakushimaru (Sōtaisei Riron etc.) as a vocalist. This song was featured as the closing theme for the anime, The Tatami Galaxy.

Discography 
 Supercar

 2004
 Nona Reeves "Ai no Taiyō" – lyrics
 Halcali "Oboroge Copy View" – lyrics

 2005
 Nona Reeves "Tōmei Girl" – lyrics
 B-Dash "New Horizon" – lyrics
 Asako Toki "Watashi no Okiniiri" – lyrics
 Chatmonchy "chatmonchy has come" – produce
 Kousuke Atari "Subete ni Imi wo Kurerumono", "Suna no Shiro" – lyrics

 2006
 Nona Reeves "Christmas Time" – lyrics
 Kousuke Atari "Michi" – lyrics
 Chatmonchy "Koi no Kemuri" – produce
 B-Dash "Oh my love" – lyrics
 Suemitsu & the Suemith "Irony (" Bittersweet Irony "Japanese Version)", "Arabesque (" Melody Played by Pianist "Japanese Version)", "Sherbet Snow and the Airplane" – Japanese lyrics
 Chatmonchy "Renai Spirits" – produce
 Kousuke Atari "Mahiru no Hanabi" – lyrics
 Chatmonchy "Miminari" – produce
 Suemitsu & the Suemith "Astaire" – Japanese lyrics
 Disco Twins "Adabana" – lyrics
 FLOW "Kandata" – lyrics
 Merengue "Kurai Tokoro de Machiawase ~ Rōdoku: Rena Tanaka" – lyrics
 Chatmonchy "Shangri-La" – produce

 2007
 Chatmonchy "Joshitachi ni Asu wa nai" – produce
 9mm Parabellum Bullet "The WORLD", "Heat-Island" – produce
 FLEET "sociologie" – lyrics
 Chatmonchy "Tobiuo no Butterfly / Sekai ga Owaru Yoru ni" – produce
 Kousuke Atari "Hitosashiyubi no Melody", "Koi no Shiori" – lyrics
 Chatmonchy "Daidai" – produce
 Kana Uemura "Anata no Sono Egao wa Ii Hint ni naru" – lyrics
 9mm Parabellum Bullet "Discommunication ep" – produce
 (Various Artists) "Rock for Baby" – supervise
 Chatmonchy "life force" – produce

 2008
 Itsco "SEKI-LALALA" – lyrics
 Superfly "Ai wo Komete Hanataba wo" – lyrics
 Chatmonchy "Hirahira Hiraku Himitsu no Tobira" – produce
 FUTABA enjoy with Tomita Labo "Get up! Do the right! featuring Chikuzen Sato & bird" – lyrics
 Suemitsu & The Suemith "The Island March", "ID" – lyrics
 9mm Parabellum Bullet "Supernova / Wanderland" – produce
 Chatmonchy "Kaze Fukeba Koi" – produce
 9mm Parabellum Bullet "Vampire" – produce

 2009
 Miho Fukuhara "La La La FIGHTERS" – lyrics

 2010
 Junji Ishiwatari & Yoshinori Sunahara + Etsuko Yakushimaru "Kamisama no Iutōri" – lyrics
 FLiP "Dear Girls" – lyrics, produce
 FLiP "mulu mole" – lyrics, arrangement, produce
 alan "Na mo Naki Tane" – lyrics
 Chiaki Kuriyama "Kanōsei Girl" – lyrics

 2011
 FLiP "Katoniago" – lyrics, arrangement, produce
 FLiP "Michi Evolution" – lyrics, arrangement, produce
 Kousuke Atari "Kimi no Kakera feat Emiri Miyamoto" – lyrics
 Seira "Shinpai bakka Mou Shinakuteiiyo" – lyrics, produce
 Rock'A'Trench "Bohemia" – lyrics, arrangement, produce
 Negoto "Karon" – lyrics, arrangement, produce
 Rock'A'Trench "Hikarisasu Hō e" – lyrics, arrangement, produce
 F.T. Island "Satisfaction", "Itsuka" – lyrics
 Rock'A'Trench "Hibi no Nukumori dakede" – lyrics, arrangement, produce
 Hi Lockation Markets "Tabibito" – lyrics
 FTIsland "Satisfaction" – lyrics
 NICO Touches the Walls "Matryoshka" – lyrics, arrangement, produce
 Chiaki Kuriyama "Kuchi ni Shita LOVE", "Knōsei Girl", "Ladies & Gentlemen" – lyrics
 S.R.S "Real Lie" – lyrics, arrangement, produce
 Halcali "Superstitions" – lyrics

2012
 F.T. Island "Neverland" – lyrics
 Girls' Generation "Paparazzi" – songwriting
 Girls' Generation "All My Love Is for You" – songwriting
 Girls' Generation "Flower Power" – lyrics

2013
 Shinee "Fire" – lyrics
 Shinee "Moon River Waltz" – lyrics

2016
 Glim Spanky "Wild Side wo Ike" – co-wrote the lyrics
 Glim Spanky "Ikari o Kure yo" – co-wrote the lyrics

2017
 EXO-CBX "Miss You" – lyrics

2018
 Taeyeon "I'm The Greatest" – lyrics

2022
 Glim Spanky "Fukou Are" – co-wrote the lyrics

References

External links 
 Official blog Kihon The Basic
 PUBLIC-IMAGE.ORG interview

1977 births
Living people
Japanese alternative rock musicians
Japanese record producers
People from Towada, Aomori
Musicians from Aomori Prefecture
Sony Music Entertainment Japan artists
Japanese rock guitarists
Japanese lyricists
Japanese songwriters
21st-century guitarists
21st-century Japanese male musicians
20th-century Japanese guitarists
21st-century Japanese guitarists
20th-century Japanese male musicians